{{Infobox settlement
| name                     = Geneva, Ohio
| settlement_type          = City
| image_seal               = Geneva, Ohio city seal.png
| image_map                = OHMap-doton-Geneva.png
| mapsize                  = 250px
| map_caption              = Location of Geneva within Ashtabula County, Ohio| image_skyline            = South Broadway, Geneva, Ohio - 20220216.jpg
| imagesize                = 250px
| image_caption            = Downtown Geneva
|image_map1                = Map of Ashtabula County Ohio Highlighting Geneva City.png
|mapsize1                  = 250px
|map_caption1              = Location of Geneva in Ashtabula County
| coordinates              = 
| subdivision_type         = Country
| subdivision_name         = United States
| subdivision_type1        = State
| subdivision_name1        = Ohio
| subdivision_type2        = County
| subdivision_name2        = Ashtabula
| subdivision_type3        = Township(s)
| subdivision_name3        = Geneva, Harpersfield
| established_title        = Area first settled
| established_date         = 1805
| established_title1       = City first settled
| established_date1        = 1816
| established_title2       = Incorporated
| established_date2        = 1866 as village1958 as city
| named_for                = Geneva, New York
| government_type          = Council–manager
| leader_title             = City manager
| leader_name              = Joseph Varckette
|area_total_sq_mi         = 4.08
|area_footnotes           = 
|area_total_km2           = 10.56
|area_land_sq_mi          = 4.08
|area_land_km2            = 10.56
|area_water_sq_mi         = 0.00
|area_water_km2           = 0.00
| elevation_ft             = 673
| elevation_m              = 205
|population_footnotes     = 
|population_as_of         = 2020
|population_est           = 
|pop_est_as_of            = 
|population_total         = 5924
|population_density_sq_mi = 1452.32
|population_density_km2   = 560.80
| timezone                 = EST
| utc_offset               = -5
| timezone_DST             = EDT
| utc_offset_DST           = -4
| postal_code_type         = ZIP code
| postal_code              = 44041
| area_code                = 440
| blank_name               = Demonym
| blank_info               = Genevan
| blank1_name              = FIPS Code
| blank1_info              = 39-29610
| blank2_name              = GNIS Feature ID
| blank2_info              = 1040812
| website                  = https://www.genevaohio.gov
|pop_est_footnotes = 
|unit_pref = Imperial
}}

Geneva is a city in northwestern Ashtabula County, Ohio, United States. The population was 5,924 at the 2020 census. The area which would become Geneva was originally settled in 1805, and was incorporated as a city in 1958. It is named after Geneva, New York.

History

The area which would eventually be Geneva was first settled in 1805 by a  handful of settlers from Charlotte, New York. In 1806, settlers from Harpersfield, New York arrived and established Harpersfield Township, which included the present-day townships of Geneva, Trumbull and Hartsgrove. However, in 1816, citizens of Harpersfield decided to withdraw from the township and form their own township, which then became Geneva Township, named after Geneva, New York. In 1866, the town of Geneva then became a village, and, nearly one hundred years later, in 1958, Geneva was incorporated as a city.

Geography

The city is bordered to the north, east and west by Geneva Township and by Harpersfield Township to the south. The Grand River flows around Geneva to the south in Harpersfield and to the west in Lake County. The Geneva State Park is located to the north of the city (within Geneva Township).

Demographics

2010 census
At the 2010 census there were 6,215 people in 2,479 households, including 1,527 families, in the city. The racial makeup of the city was 94.3% White, 1.7% African American, 0.1% Native American, 0.5% Asian, 1.8% from other races, and 1.7% from two or more races. Hispanic or Latino of any race were 5.5%.

Of the 2,479 households 30.9% had children under the age of 18 living with them, 43.1% were married couples living together, 13.8% had a female householder with no husband present, 4.7% had a male householder with no wife present, and 38.4% were non-families. 32.0% of households were one person and 14.1% were one person aged 65 or older. The average household size was 2.36 and the average family size was 2.96.

The median age was 40.9 years. 22.2% of residents were under the age of 18; 7.8% were between the ages of 18 and 24; 25.3% were from 25 to 44; 26.9% were from 45 to 64; and 17.8% were 65 or older. The gender makeup of the city was 48.8% male and 51.2% female.

2000 census
At the 2000 census there were 6,595 people in 2,515 households, including 1,607 families, in the city. The population density was 1,650.4 people per square mile (636.6/km). There were 2,660 housing units at an average density of 665.7 per square mile (256.8/km).  The racial makeup of the city was 94.84% White, 1.15% African American, 0.15% Native American, 0.24% Asian, 0.03% Pacific Islander, 1.80% from other races, and 1.77% from two or more races. Hispanic or Latino of any race were 5.94%.

Of the 2,515 households 30.6% had children under the age of 18 living with them, 47.6% were married couples living together, 12.2% had a female householder with no husband present, and 36.1% were non-families. 30.0% of households were one person and 13.0% were one person aged 65 or older. The average household size was 2.44 and the average family size was 3.04.

The age distribution was 23.9% under the age of 18, 8.9% from 18 to 24, 27.6% from 25 to 44, 22.0% from 45 to 64, and 17.6% 65 or older. The median age was 38 years. For every 100 females, there were 92.6 males and for every 100 females age 18 and over, there were 90.2 males.

The median household income was $35,048 and the median family income  was $41,511. Males had a median income of $31,817 versus $23,927 for females. The per capita income for the city was $16,940. About 5.1% of families and 9.4% of the population were below the poverty line, including 6.5% of those under age 18 and 10.9% of those age 65 or over.

Economy
Geneva is home to HDT Global, an industrial outfit that manufactures air conditioning, heating, and filtration units for heavy industry. In recent years, they have been awarded over $100 million in U.S. Department of Defense contracts.

In the 2000s, a levy for new school buildings was passed.  The Geneva Junior High will be remade and include 6th grade as of the school year of 2010–2011.  Spencer Elementary and Geneva Elementary are also being remade into one new school, Geneva Platt R. Spencer Elementary, which includes K-5.  The Geneva High School was also remade.

In January 2020, a major local economic driver, SPIRE Institute and Academy, was sold to a new owner. It was later announced that there are plans to expand their current programs and offerings in Geneva and in Maryland.

Arts and culture
Geneva Grape Jamboree
The Grape Jamboree is an annual celebration of the area's grape-growing and wine-producing industries. The festival occurs during the final full weekend of September, and lasts both days. Festivities include two parades, one held on each day, as well as various amusement park-type rides and typical festival food kiosks set up on the main streets (Route 20 and Route 534) of Geneva. Other activities include musical performances and an art show.

West Liberty Covered Bridge
An addition to Ashtabula County's existing covered bridges, the West Liberty Covered Bridge, purported to be the shortest covered bridge in the United States, opened in 2011.

Declaration of Lunar Ownership
On April 12, 1966, more than 200 people attended ceremonies at Geneva High School at which it was revealed that the city had claimed ownership of the moon. The "Declaration of Lunar Ownership" contained 35 signatures, and was revealed simultaneously with the city's 100th anniversary. It claimed that the "physical property of the moon shall belong exclusively to the citizens of Geneva, Ohio," and that unfriendly acts upon the city would be responded to with "all human dignity and moral circumspection."

Education

The Geneva Area City School District provides K–12 education to students in Geneva as well as Geneva Township (including Geneva-on-the-Lake), Harpersfield Township, Trumbull Township and Austinburg Township (including Austinburg). The district has three elementary schools (Geneva Platt R. Spencer Elementary, Cork Elementary and Austinburg Elementary), one middle school (Geneva Middle School) and one high school (Geneva High School). The elementary schools serve students in grades K–5, while the middle school and high schools serve students in grades 6–8 and 9–12 respectively. The district has an open enrollment policy, allowing students from the entire county, as well as Lake and Geauga Counties to enroll.

Geneva has a public library, a branch of the Ashtabula County District Library.

Infrastructure
Three major routes pass through (or near) Geneva. Interstate 90, the northernmost east–west and coast-to-coast interstate, passes roughly two miles south of the city. There, a full-access interchange (exit 218) intersects Route 534, which passes through Geneva and terminates north of the city. Route 534 intersects Route 20, the longest road in the United States, in downtown Geneva.

Notable people
 Brian Anderson, a Major League Baseball pitcher who played for the California Angels, Cleveland Indians, Arizona Diamondbacks (with whom he won a World Series in 2001) and Kansas City Royals
 Tammy Cochran, a country music singer, sang "Angels in Waiting," graduated from Geneva High School in 1989
 Emy Coligado, an actress best known for her role as Piama on the sitcom Malcolm in the Middle''
 Edward S. Ellis, an author best known for writing hundreds of dime novels under his own name and various pen names
 Ellen Spencer Mussey, lawyer, educator, and pioneer in the field of women's rights to legal education
 Ransom E. Olds, automotive pioneer, namesake of Oldsmobile and REO brands, was born in Geneva
 Paul Jessup, writer and video game designer.
 Mickey Sanzotta, an NFL running back who played for the Detroit Lions
 Platt Rogers Spencer, a calligrapher who invented Spencerian Script, a form of cursive handwriting, and namesake of Spencer Elementary School
 Freeman Thorpe, an artist who has 46 works listed in the Smithsonian Institution's Inventory of American Paintings and Sculptures, eight of which (including a painting of Abraham Lincoln) are housed within the United States Capitol
 Laura Rosamond White, an author, editor, and poet

References

External links

 City website

 
Cities in Ashtabula County, Ohio
Populated places established in 1816
1816 establishments in Ohio
Cities in Ohio